The Tanks Are Coming is a 1941 American Technicolor short film. It is primarily a recruitment film, but can also be regarded as a propaganda film or a documentary with some light relief. Like Dive Bomber (of the same year) it is a pre-Pearl Harbor film, made with the co-operation of the relevant branch of the US armed forces, showing off US military material to the US public, in lavish Technicolor. This material is shown in motion, both on the road and in the field; training equipment and methods are also featured.

It was nominated for an Academy Award at the 14th Academy Awards for Best Short Subject (Two-Reel).

Premise 
New York taxicab driver Malowski (George Tobias) and his cab Betsy enlist in the "First Armored Force" and get caught up in large-scale mechanized maneuvers. The tanks featured in the short were the U.S Army's M2A4 light tank and the M2A1 medium tank.

Credited cast 
 George Tobias as Malowski
 William Travis (i.e. Richard Travis) as Pete
 Byron Barr [later known as Gig Young] as Jim Allen
 Frank Wilcox as Colonel

Production 
A young Richard Egan appears uncredited in a few scenes and has a few lines. He enlisted in the Army in 1942 and achieved the rank of captain. He started his actual film career in 1949.

References

External links 
 

1941 films
1941 documentary films
1941 short films
American short documentary films
American World War II propaganda shorts
Documentary films about World War II
Films about armoured warfare
Warner Bros. short films
Films scored by William Lava
1940s short documentary films
Films directed by B. Reeves Eason
1940s English-language films
1940s American films